Châteauvillain is a commune in the Haute-Marne department in north-eastern France.

Geography

The Aujon flows north-northwestward through the western part of the commune and crosses the village.

See also
Communes of the Haute-Marne department

References

Communes of Haute-Marne
Champagne (province)